Main page: List of Canadian plants by family

Families:
A | B | C | D | E | F | G | H | I J K | L | M | N | O | P Q | R | S | T | U V W | X Y Z

Fabaceae 

 Acmispon decumbens, syn. Lotus nevadensis – Nevada bird's-foot trefoil
 Amorpha canescens – downy indigobush
 Amorpha fruticosa – false indigobush
 Amorpha nana – fragrant indigobush
 Amphicarpaea bracteata – American hog-peanut
 Apios americana – American groundnut
 Astragalus adsurgens – rattle milkvetch
 Astragalus agrestis – Don meadow milkvetch
 Astragalus alpinus – alpine milkvetch
 Astragalus americanus – American milkvetch
 Astragalus australis – Indian milkvetch
 Astragalus beckwithii – Beckwith's milkvetch
 Astragalus bisulcatus – two-grooved milkvetch
 Astragalus bodinii – Bodin's milkvetch
 Astragalus bourgovii – Bourgeau's milkvetch
 Astragalus canadensis – Canadian milkvetch
 Astragalus collinus – rattle milkvetch
 Astragalus convallarius – lesser rushy milkvetch
 Astragalus crassicarpus – ground-plum
 Astragalus drummondii – Drummond's milkvetch
 Astragalus eucosmus – pretty milkvetch
 Astragalus filipes – basalt milkvetch
 Astragalus flexuosus – flexible milkvetch
 Astragalus gilviflorus – three-leaf milkvetch
 Astragalus kentrophyta – spiny milkvetch
 Astragalus lentiginosus – mottled milkvetch
 Astragalus lotiflorus – low milkvetch
 Astragalus microcystis – least bladdery milkvetch
 Astragalus miser – timber milkvetch
 Astragalus missouriensis – Missouri milkvetch
 Astragalus neglectus – Cooper's milkvetch
 Astragalus nutzotinensis – Nutzotin milkvetch
 Astragalus pectinatus – narrowleaf milkvetch
 Astragalus purshii – Pursh's milkvetch
 Astragalus racemosus – racemose milkvetch
 Astragalus robbinsii – Robbins' milkvetch
 Astragalus sclerocarpus – woody-pod milkvetch
 Astragalus spaldingii – Spalding's milkvetch
 Astragalus spatulatus – tufted milkvetch
 Astragalus tenellus – looseflower milkvetch
 Astragalus umbellatus – tundra milkvetch
 Astragalus vexilliflexus – bent-flowered milkvetch
 Astragalus williamsii – Williams' milkvetch
 Baptisia alba – prairie false indigo
 Baptisia tinctoria – yellow wild indigo
 Cercis canadensis – eastern redbud
 Dalea candida – white prairie-clover
 Dalea purpurea – purple prairie-clover
 Dalea villosa – silky prairie-clover
 Desmodium canadense – showy tick-trefoil
 Desmodium canescens – hoary tick-trefoil
 Desmodium cuspidatum – toothed tick-trefoil
 Desmodium glutinosum – large tick-trefoil
 Desmodium nudiflorum – bare-stemmed tick-trefoil
 Desmodium paniculatum – panicled-leaf tick-trefoil
 Desmodium perplexum – perplexed tick-trefoil
 Desmodium rotundifolium – prostrate tick-trefoil
 Gleditsia triacanthos – honey-locust
 Glycyrrhiza lepidota – wild licorice
 Gymnocladus dioicus – Kentucky coffee-tree
 Hedysarum alpinum – alpine sweetvetch
 Hedysarum boreale – boreal sweetvetch
 Hedysarum occidentale – western sweetvetch
 Hedysarum sulphurescens – yellow sweetvetch
 Lathyrus bijugatus – Latah tule-pea
 Lathyrus japonicus – beach pea
 Lathyrus littoralis – grey beach peavine
 Lathyrus nevadensis – Sierra Nevada peavine
 Lathyrus ochroleucus – pale vetchling peavine
 Lathyrus palustris – vetchling peavine
 Lathyrus venosus – smooth veiny peavine
 Lespedeza capitata – roundhead bushclover
 Lespedeza hirta – hairy bushclover
 Lespedeza intermedia – wand bushclover
 Lespedeza procumbens – trailing bushclover
 Lespedeza violacea – violet bushclover
 Lespedeza virginica – slender bushclover
 Lespedeza x longifolia
 Lespedeza x nuttallii – Nuttall's bushclover
 Lotus denticulatus – meadow trefoil
 Lotus formosissimus – seaside trefoil
 Lotus micranthus – smallflower trefoil
 Lotus parviflorus – smallflower trefoil
 Lotus pinnatus – bog bird's-foot trefoil
 Lotus unifoliolatus – American bird's-foot trefoil
 Lupinus albicaulis – sickle-keel lupine
 Lupinus arbustus – longspur lupine
 Lupinus arcticus – Arctic lupine
 Lupinus argenteus – silvery lupine
 Lupinus bicolor – Lindley's lupine
 Lupinus bingenensis – Bingen lupine
 Lupinus burkei – Burke's lupine
 Lupinus caespitosus – stemless dwarf lupine
 Lupinus caudatus – Kellogg's spurred lupine
 Lupinus densiflorus – dense-flowered lupine
 Lupinus formosus – summer lupine
 Lupinus kuschei – Yukon lupine
 Lupinus latifolius – broadleaf lupine
 Lupinus lepidus – prairie lupine
 Lupinus leucophyllus – woolly-leaf lupine
 Lupinus littoralis – seashore lupine
 Lupinus lyallii – Lyall's lupine
 Lupinus minimus – Kettle Falls lupine
 Lupinus nootkatensis – Nootka lupine
 Lupinus oreganus – Oregon lupine
 Lupinus parviflorus – lodgepole lupine
 Lupinus perennis – sundial lupine
 Lupinus polycarpus – smallflower lupine
 Lupinus polyphyllus – largeleaf lupine
 Lupinus prunophilus – hairy bigleaf lupine
 Lupinus pusillus – small lupine
 Lupinus rivularis – riverbank lupine
 Lupinus sericeus – Pursh's silky lupine
 Lupinus sulphureus – sulphur-flower lupine
 Lupinus vallicola – open lupine
 Lupinus wyethii – Wyeth's lupine
 Lupinus x alpestris
 Oxytropis arctica – arctic crazyweed
 Oxytropis besseyi – Bessey's locoweed
 Oxytropis borealis – boreal locoweed
 Oxytropis campestris – northern yellow pointvetch
 Oxytropis deflexa – pendant-pod pointvetch
 Oxytropis huddelsonii – Huddelson's crazyweed
 Oxytropis lagopus – hare's-foot pointvetch
 Oxytropis lambertii – stemless pointvetch
 Oxytropis maydelliana – Maydell's pointvetch
 Oxytropis mertensiana – Mertens' crazyweed
 Oxytropis monticola – yellowflower locoweed
 Oxytropis nigrescens – blackish crazyweed
 Oxytropis podocarpa – Gray's pointvetch
 Oxytropis scammaniana – Scamman's crazyweed
 Oxytropis sericea – white pointvetch
 Oxytropis splendens – showy pointvetch
 Pediomelum argophyllum – silvery scurfpea
 Pediomelum esculentum – pomme-de-prairie
 Psoralidium lanceolatum – lanceleaf scurfpea
 Psoralidium tenuiflorum – few-flowered scurfpea
 Rupertia physodes – California scurfpea
 Senna hebecarpa – wild senna
 Strophostyles helvula – trailing wild bean
 Tephrosia virginiana – goat's-rue
 Thermopsis rhombifolia – roundleaf thermopsis
 Trifolium cyathiferum – bowl clover
 Trifolium depauperatum – balloon sack clover
 Trifolium dichotomum – branched Indian clover
 Trifolium fucatum – sour clover
 Trifolium macraei – McCrae's clover
 Trifolium microcephalum – smallhead clover
 Trifolium microdon – Valparaiso clover
 Trifolium oliganthum – few-flower clover
 Trifolium variegatum – whitetip clover
 Trifolium willdenowii – springbank clover
 Trifolium wormskioldii – Wormskjold's clover
 Vicia americana – American purple vetch
 Vicia caroliniana – Carolina wood vetch
 Vicia nigricans – black vetch

Fabroniaceae 

 Anacamptodon splachnoides – knothole moss
 Fabronia ciliaris
 Fabronia pusilla

Fagaceae 

 Castanea dentata – American chestnut
 Fagus grandifolia – American beech
 Quercus alba – white oak
 Quercus bicolor – swamp white oak
 Quercus ellipsoidalis – northern pin oak
 Quercus garryana – Oregon white oak
 Quercus ilicifolia – scrub oak
 Quercus macrocarpa – bur oak
 Quercus muehlenbergii – Chinquapin oak
 Quercus palustris – pin oak
 Quercus prinoides – dwarf Chinquapin oak
 Quercus rubra – northern red oak
 Quercus shumardii – Shumard's oak
 Quercus velutina – black oak
 Quercus x bebbiana
 Quercus x deamii
 Quercus x hawkinsiae
 Quercus x jackiana
 Quercus x palaeolithicola
 Quercus x schuettei

Fissidentaceae 

 Fissidens adianthoides
 Fissidens aphelotaxifolius
 Fissidens bryoides
 Fissidens bushii
 Fissidens dubius
 Fissidens exilis – small pocket moss
 Fissidens fontanus
 Fissidens grandifrons
 Fissidens limbatus
 Fissidens obtusifolius
 Fissidens osmundioides – Osmund fissidens moss
 Fissidens pauperculus
 Fissidens subbasilaris
 Fissidens taxifolius
 Fissidens ventricosus

Fontinalaceae 

 Dichelyma capillaceum
 Dichelyma falcatum
 Dichelyma pallescens
 Dichelyma uncinatum – dichelyma moss
 Fontinalis antipyretica – aquatic moss
 Fontinalis dalecarlica
 Fontinalis flaccida
 Fontinalis hypnoides
 Fontinalis macmillanii
 Fontinalis missourica
 Fontinalis neomexicana
 Fontinalis novae-angliae
 Fontinalis sphagnifolia
 Fontinalis sullivantii

Fossombroniaceae 

 Fossombronia foveolata
 Fossombronia longiseta
 Fossombronia wondraczekii

Fumariaceae 

 Adlumia fungosa – climbing fumitory
 Corydalis aurea – golden corydalis
 Corydalis flavula – yellow corydalis
 Corydalis pauciflora – few-flower corydalis
 Corydalis scouleri – Scouler's corydalis
 Corydalis sempervirens – pale corydalis
 Dicentra canadensis – squirrel-corn
 Dicentra cucullaria – Dutchman's breeches
 Dicentra formosa – Pacific bleedinghearts
 Dicentra uniflora – one-flower bleedinghearts

Funariaceae 

 Aphanorrhegma serratum
 Entosthodon fascicularis
 Entosthodon rubiginosus
 Funaria americana
 Funaria flavicans
 Funaria hygrometrica
 Funaria microstoma
 Funaria muhlenbergii
 Physcomitrella patens
 Physcomitrium collenchymatum
 Physcomitrium hookeri
 Physcomitrium immersum
 Physcomitrium pyriforme